is a passenger railway station located in the town of Kaiyō, Kaifu District, Tokushima Prefecture, Japan.  It is operated by the third-sector Asa Seaside Railway and bears the station number "AK28".

Lines
Kaifu Station is served by the Asato Line and located 1.5 km from the terminus of the line at Awa-Kainan Station. The JR Mugi Line hasn't interconnected with Asa Seaside Railway since 2021.

Layout
The station, which is unstaffed, consists of two side platforms serving two tracks on an elevated structure. There is no station building and the station is unstaffed. Access to the platforms is by means of a flight of steps and the two platforms are linked by a level crossing across the tracks. A bike shed is provided at the base of the elevated structure.

Land development had led to the entire hill being removed but the tunnel structure was left intact.

Adjacent stations

|-
!colspan=5|Asa Seaside Railway

History
On 1 April 1987, with the privatization of JNR, control of the station passed to JR Shikoku.

On 23 December 2015, a local community group in Kaiyō opened a community interaction centre underneath the elevated structure of the station to promote interaction between senior citizens and children in the town. It was located in the premises of a former town tourism information centre which had been built there in 1995.

Since 1 November 2020, the station has been transferred to Asa Seaside Railway from JR Shikoku as DMV is commenced operations from summer 2021.

Surrounding area
Kaiyo Town Hall Kaifu Government Building

See also
 List of Railway Stations in Japan

References

External links

 Asa Kaigan Railway official website 

Railway stations in Tokushima Prefecture
Railway stations in Japan opened in 1973
Kaiyō, Tokushima